Khangiran Rural District is a rural district (dehestan) in the Central District of Sarakhs County, Razavi Khorasan Province, Iran. At the 2006 census, its population was 6,530, in 1,445 families.  The rural district has 11 villages.

References 

Rural Districts of Razavi Khorasan Province
Sarakhs County